This is a list of government-run higher-level military academies worldwide:

Argentina
Escuela Superior de Guerra (Argentina)
Colegio Militar de la Nación - El Palomar, Buenos Aires Province
Military Naval School - Río Santiago, Buenos Aires Province
Military Aviation School - Córdoba, Córdoba Province

Australia
Australian Defence Force Academy
Royal Military College, Duntroon

Austria
Theresian Military Academy - Wiener Neustadt (the oldest military academy in the world, founded by Empress Maria Theresa)

Belgium
Royal Military Academy - Brussels

Brazil
Agulhas Negras Military Academy - Rio de Janeiro
Brazilian Air Force Academy - Pirassununga
Brazilian Naval Academy - Rio de Janeiro

Bulgaria 
 Vasil Levski National Military University, Veliko Tarnovo
 Faculty of Anti-Aircraft Defence - Shumen
 Faculty of Aviation - Dolna Mitropoliya
 Rakovski Defence and Staff College, Sofia
 Nikola Vaptsarov Naval Academy, Varna

Canada
 Royal Military College of Canada - Kingston, Ontario
 Collège militaire royal de Saint-Jean -Saint-Jean, Quebec

People's Republic of China
 PLA National University of Defense Technology
PLA Information Engineering University
PLA National Defense University
Army Command College of the Chinese People's Liberation Army

Republic of China (Taiwan)
Chinese Military Academy - Fongshan
Chinese Naval Academy
Chinese Air Force Academy
National Defense University
National Defense Medical Center

Czech Republic
 University of Defence - Brno

Finland
National Defence University - Helsinki

France
École Spéciale Militaire de Saint-Cyr - Coëtquidan
École Navale
École de l'Air
École Polytechnique (though still under military management and with most undergraduate students military cadets, is not a military academy any more)

Germany
Führungsakademie der Bundeswehr - Hamburg

Greece
Hellenic Army Academy - Athens

India
Indian Military Academy - Dehradun
National Defence Academy - Khadakwasla
Defence Services Staff College - Wellington
Indian Naval Academy - Ezhimala
Officers Training Academy - Chennai

Indonesia 
Akademi Militer - Magelang
Akademi Angkatan Udara - Yogyakarta
Akademi Angkatan Laut - Surabaya
Universitas Pertahanan - Sentul Bogor

Italy
Accademia Militare - Modena
Accademia navale - Livorno
Accademia Aeronautica - Pozzuoli, Naples
Accademia della Guardia di Finanza - Bergamo
Scuola militare Nunziatella - Naples
Scuola militare Teuliè - Milan
Scuola militare navale Francesco Morosini - Venice

Japan
National Defense Academy of Japan - Yokosuka, Kanagawa
Japan National Defense Medical College - Tokorozawa, Saitama
Japan Coast Guard Academy - Kure, Hiroshima
Naval Academy Etajima - Etajima, Hiroshima

North Korea
Kim Il-sung Military University

South Korea
Korea Military Academy - Taerung
Korea National Defense University

Malaysia
National Defence University of Malaysia - Kuala Lumpur

Mexico
Heroico Colegio Militar - Mexico City

Myanmar
 Defence Services Academy
 Defence Services Technological Academy 
 Defence Services Medical Academy
 Officer Training School
 Command and General Staff College
 National Defence College
 Military Institute of Nursing and Paramedical Science

Netherlands
Koninklijke Militaire Academie - Breda
Royal Netherlands Naval College (Koninklijk Instituut voor de Marine) - Den Helder
 Netherlands Defence Academy - Breda and Den Helder

New Zealand
New Zealand Defence College - Trentham Military Camp, Upper Hutt

Nigeria
Nigerian Defence Academy - Kaduna

Norway
Norwegian Military Academy - Oslo
Royal Norwegian Air Force War Academy - Trondheim
Royal Norwegian Naval War Academy - Bergen

Pakistan
Pakistan Military Academy - Kakul
Pakistan Air Force Academy - Risalpur
Pakistan Naval Academy - Karachi
Pakistan Marine Academy - Karachi
Pakistan Command and Staff College - Quetta

Philippines
Philippine Military Academy (PMA) - Loakan, Baguio
Philippine Merchant Marine Academy (PMMA) - San Narciso, Zambales

Poland
Academy of National Defence - Warsaw
Military University of Technology in Warsaw
Tadeusz Kościuszko Land Forces Military Academy - Wrocław 
Air Forces Military Academy - Dęblin
Polish Naval Academy - Gdynia 
Medical University of Łódź, Faculty of Military Medicine

Portugal
 Escola Naval - Almada
 Academia Militar - Lisbon
 Academia da Força Aérea - Sintra
 Instituto de Estudos Superiores Militares - Lisbon

Romania
Academy of Higher Military Studies - Bucharest
Technical Military Academy - Bucharest
Mircea cel Bătrân Naval Academy - Constanţa

Russia

Military Academy of the General Staff of the Armed Forces of Russia
N. G. Kuznetsov Naval Academy
Gagarin Air Force Academy
Military Engineering-Technical University

Sri Lanka
Sir John Kotelawala Defence University - Colombo

Singapore
SAFTI Military Institute

South Africa
South African Military Academy - Saldanha Bay

Serbia
Serbia Military Academy - Belgrade
Military Medical Academy - Belgrade

Spain
Academia General Militar - Zaragoza
Escuela Naval Militar - Marín, Pontevedra
Academia General del Aire - San Javier, Murcia

Sweden
Military Academy Karlberg - Karlberg Castle, Stockholm
Swedish National Defence College - Stockholm

Switzerland
Military Academy at ETH(MILAK) - Zürich

Thailand
Chulachomklao Royal Military Academy - Nakhon Nayok.
Royal Thai Naval Academy - Pak nam, Samut Prakan.
Royal Thai Air Force Academy - Don Mueang, Bangkok.

Turkey
National Defense University
Turkish Military Academy - Ankara
Turkish Naval Academy - İstanbul
Turkish Air Force Academy - İstanbul

Uganda
 Uganda Senior Command and Staff College: Kimaka, Jinja, Jinja District. 
 UPDF Air Force Academy: Nakasongola, Nakasongola District
 Uganda Military Engineering College: Lugazi, Buikwe District
 Uganda Military Academy: Kabamba, Mubende District
 National Defence College, Uganda: Njeru,  Buikwe District.

United Kingdom
Britannia Royal Naval College - Dartmouth
Royal Military Academy Sandhurst - Camberley
Royal Air Force College - Cranwell

United States

Air Force Institute of Technology - Dayton, Ohio
Air Force Institute of Technology 
Naval Postgraduate School - Monterey, CA
Naval Postgraduate School - Monterey, CA
United States Military Academy - West Point, New York
United States Naval Academy - Annapolis, Maryland
United States Air Force Academy - Colorado Springs, Colorado
United States Coast Guard Academy - New London, Connecticut
United States Merchant Marine Academy - Kings Point, New York
Uniformed Services University of the Health Sciences - Bethesda, Maryland
National Defense University

Military academies
Government-run